Billy Baker (born 1894 in West Derby, England) was an English professional boxer.

Born in West Derby, Baker's professional boxing career lasted from 1946 to 1955.

He was married but he and his wife had no children.

References

External links
 

1894 births
Year of death missing
English male boxers
Bantamweight boxers
Boxers from Derby